United Nations Day is an annual commemorative day, reflecting the official creation of the United Nations on 24 October 1945. In 1947, the United Nations General Assembly declared 24 October, the anniversary of the Charter of the United Nations, to "be devoted to making known to the people of the world the aims and achievements of the United Nations and to gaining their support for" its work.

In 1971, the United Nations General Assembly adopted a further resolution (United Nations Resolution 2782) declaring that United Nations Day shall be an international observance or international holiday and recommended that it should be observed as a public holiday by United Nations member states.

World War II Allies' day
The first event called "United Nations Day" was a World War II Allies' day of solidarity and military parades launched by US President Franklin D. Roosevelt tied to US Flag Day on 14 June 1942, six months after the Declaration by United Nations. It was observed in New York City as the "New York at War" parade, in London, and by the Soviet and Chinese governments.

It was observed throughout World War II, during 1942–1944. Prior to the foundation of the UN itself, it was not directly connected to the current international observance.

Commemoration
U.N. Day has traditionally been marked throughout the world with meetings, discussions and exhibits about the achievements and goals of the organization. In 1971, the General Assembly recommended that member states observe it as a public holiday.

Several international schools throughout the world would also celebrate the diversity of their student body on United Nations Day (although the event is not necessarily celebrated on 24 October). Celebrations often include a show of cultural performances in the evening and a food fair, where food is available from all over the world.

On United Nations Day in 1951, the United Nations Postal Administration issued the first UN Stamps, which were issued in U.S. Dollars at the U.N. Headquarters in New York.

In the United States, the President has issued a proclamation each year for United Nations Day since 1948.

In Kosovo, which is administered by the Interim Administration Mission, United Nations Day is an official non-working day.

In the Philippines, local schoolchildren customarily dress in the national costumes of member states and hold a programme on U.N. Day, which is the last school day before semestral break. Individual students, classes, or grade levels are assigned a country to represent and study; students handcraft their assigned country's flag, and prepare cultural presentations and food as part of the day's educational activities. Some schools hold beauty pageants "Mr And Ms United Nations", that focus on the culture, talent and physical attributes.

See also

 International Day of United Nations Peacekeepers
 Commonwealth Day
 Europe Day
 Global citizenship

References

External links
 UN Day

United Nations days
October observances
Recurring events established in 1948
International organization days
1948 introductions
Swedish flag flying days